H. Légeret (date of birth unknown) was a footballer who played for FC Basel. He played as striker and as midfielder in the 1910s.

Football career
Légeret joined Basel's first team for their 1908–09 season. Légeret played his domestic league debut for the club in the home game in the Landhof on 25 October 1908 as Basel were defeated 2–9 by Grasshopper Club.

Légeret scored one goal in the friendly match at home on 14 February 1909, but this could not help the team because they lost the game 1–2 against La Chaux-de-Fonds. He played one season for the Basel and in at least four games for them. At least two of these games were in the Swiss Serie A and two were friendly games.

Notes

Footnotes

Incomplete league matches 1908–1909 season: FCB-YF, FCZ-FCB, FCB-Aarau, FCW-FCB, FCB-FCSG, YF-FCB, FCB-FCB, FCB-OB, GC-FCB, FCSG-FCB

References

Sources
 Rotblau: Jahrbuch Saison 2017/2018. Publisher: FC Basel Marketing AG. 
 Die ersten 125 Jahre. Publisher: Josef Zindel im Friedrich Reinhardt Verlag, Basel. 

FC Basel players
Association football midfielders
Association football forwards
Swiss Super League players
Date of birth missing
Date of death missing
Swiss men's footballers